John Frederick Keeling Hinde (3 October 1928 – 31 May 2017) was a British coxswain. He competed at the 1952 Summer Olympics in Helsinki with the men's eight where they came fourth, and in the 1956 Summer Olympics in Melbourne, again in the men's eight.

References

1928 births
2017 deaths 
British male rowers
Olympic rowers of Great Britain
Rowers at the 1952 Summer Olympics
Rowers at the 1956 Summer Olympics
People from Camberwell
Coxswains (rowing)
European Rowing Championships medalists